This is a list of properties and historic districts in Missouri on the National Register of Historic Places. There are NRHP listings in all of Missouri's 114 counties and the one independent city of St. Louis.



Current listings by county
The following are approximate tallies of current listings by county. These counts are based on entries in the National Register Information Database as of March 13, 2009 and new weekly listings posted since then on the National Register of Historic Places web site. There are frequent additions to the listings and occasional delistings and the counts here are approximate and not official. New entries are added to the official Register on a weekly basis.  Also, the counts in this table exclude boundary increase and decrease listings which modify the area covered by an existing property or district and which carry a separate National Register reference number.

Adair County

Andrew County

|}

Atchison County

Audrain County

|}

Barry County

Barton County

|}

Bates County

|}

Benton County

|}

Bollinger County

|}

Boone County

Buchanan County

Butler County

Caldwell County

|}

Callaway County

Camden County

Cape Girardeau County

Carroll County

Carter County

Cass County

Cedar County

|}

Chariton County

Christian County

|}

Clark County

Clay County

Clinton County

|}

Cole County

Cooper County

Crawford County

Dade County

|}

Former listing

|}

Dallas County

|}

Daviess County

|}

DeKalb County

|}

Dent County

Douglas County

|}

Dunklin County

Franklin County

Gasconade County

Gentry County

|}

Greene County

Grundy County

Harrison County

|}

Henry County

Hickory County

|}

Holt County

|}

Former listings

|}

Howard County

Howell County

Iron County

Jackson County

Jasper County

Jefferson County

Johnson County

Knox County

|}

Laclede County

Lafayette County

Lawrence County

|}

Lewis County

Lincoln County

Linn County

Livingston County

|}

Macon County

Madison County

Maries County

|}

Marion County

McDonald County

|}

Mercer County

|}

Miller County

Mississippi County

Moniteau County

Monroe County

Montgomery County

Morgan County

|}

New Madrid County

Newton County

Nodaway County

Oregon County

|}

Osage County

Ozark County

|}

Pemiscot County

Perry County

Pettis County

Phelps County

Pike County

Platte County

Polk County

|}

Pulaski County

Putnam County

|}

Ralls County

Randolph County

|}

Ray County

Reynolds County

|}

Ripley County

St. Charles County

St. Clair County

|}

St. Francois County

Ste. Genevieve County

St. Louis (city)

St. Louis County

Saline County

Schuyler County

|}

Scotland County

|}

Scott County

Shannon County

Shelby County

|}

Stoddard County

|}

Stone County

|}

Sullivan County

Taney County

Texas County

Vernon County

Warren County

Washington County

Wayne County

|}

Webster County

|}

Worth County

|}

Wright County

See also
Historic houses in Missouri
List of bridges on the National Register of Historic Places in Missouri
List of National Historic Landmarks in Missouri

References

External links
 Missouri National Register Listings at the Missouri Department of Natural Resources

Missouri